Theodora (Nora) Drakou (Greek: Θεοδώρα Δράκου) is a Greek competitive swimmer, competing for Panathinaikos.

At the 2012 Summer Olympics, she competed in the 50 metre freestyle taking the 16th place and for the national team in the 4 x 100 metre freestyle relay, finishing also in the 16th (last) place in the heats, failing to reach the final.

Honours

References

Greek female swimmers
Living people
Sportspeople from Patras
Olympic swimmers of Greece
Panathinaikos swimmers
Swimmers at the 2012 Summer Olympics
Swimmers at the 2016 Summer Olympics
Greek female freestyle swimmers
1992 births
Mediterranean Games gold medalists for Greece
Mediterranean Games silver medalists for Greece
Mediterranean Games bronze medalists for Greece
Swimmers at the 2009 Mediterranean Games
Swimmers at the 2013 Mediterranean Games
Mediterranean Games medalists in swimming
Swimmers at the 2018 Mediterranean Games
Swimmers at the 2020 Summer Olympics